O Século  (meaning The Century in English) was a Portuguese daily newspaper published in Lisbon, Portugal, from 1881 to 1977.

History and profile
O Século was first published on 4 January 1881. The founder was Sebastião de Magalhães Lima, who had studied law at the University of Coimbra. It was a newspaper of record, and a great rival of the Diário de Notícias.

O Século was owned by the Sociedade Nacional de Tipografia before the Carnation Revolution in 1974. The paper ceased publication on 3 February 1977.

See also
List of newspapers in Portugal

References

1881 establishments in Portugal
1977 disestablishments in Portugal
Defunct newspapers published in Portugal
Newspapers published in Lisbon
Portuguese-language newspapers
Publications established in 1881
Publications disestablished in 1977